Margaret Ryan (1944–2019) was a children's writer who lived in St. Andrews, Scotland. She was born and raised in the town of Paisley, Scotland. She went to the University of Glasgow, where she met her husband, John, at a dance. She and John had two grown-up children, Susie and Jonathan. She was the writer of the Airy Fairy books. She had a long career as a primary school teacher before becoming a full-time writer for children.
She shared her name with a young Welsh Baroness.

Books
 Airy Fairy: Magic Mischief
 Airy Fairy: Magic Muddle
 Airy Fairy: Magic Mess
 Airy Fairy: Magic Mix-up
 Airy Fairy: Magic Mistakes
 Airy Fairy: Magic Music
 Airy Fairy's Book of Magic

References 

Three Tales

External links

Living people
Scottish children's writers
Scottish fantasy writers
Writers from Paisley, Renfrewshire
Scottish women writers
Women science fiction and fantasy writers
1944 births